Hamza Ahmed Yassin (born 22 February 1990) is a Sudanese-British wildlife cameraman and presenter, known for his role as Ranger Hamza on the children's television channel CBeebies and his work on shows such as Countryfile and Animal Park, as well as presenting programmes about Scottish wildlife. In 2022, he won the twentieth series of the BBC contest Strictly Come Dancing.

Early life 
Born in Sudan on 22 February 1990, Yassin moved to Northampton in the UK aged eight, not knowing any English. After being diagnosed as dyslexic as a teenager while a student at Wellingborough School, he was supported throughout the rest of his studies. He went on to achieve a degree in Zoology with Conservation from Bangor University and a Masters in Biological Photography and Imaging from the University of Nottingham.

When he was 21, Yassin moved to the Scottish Highlands to study the local wildlife and develop his career; he now lives in Kilchoan.

Television 
Yassin is known for the CBeebies shows Let's Go for a Walk, in the role of Ranger Hamza, and he has written a book based on the series. In late 2020, he presented Scotland: My Life in the Wild, a one-off Channel 4 documentary about his life and the wildlife living on the Ardnamurchan peninsula in the Highlands of Scotland.

Yassin has appeared on The One Show and as a guest presenter on Countryfile, and in 2021 he joined the BBC series Animal Park about the lives of keepers and animals at Longleat Safari Park. In the same year, he presented Scotland: Escape to the Wilderness, a four-part Channel 4 series in which he took four celebrities (Martin Clunes, Baroness Warsi, Ben Miller and Richard Coles) to wild locations around Scotland, showing them the local wildlife. 

In 2022, he appeared as a contestant on the twentieth series of Strictly Come Dancing, partnering with Jowita Przystał. On 17 December 2022, despite finishing bottom of the leaderboard in the final, they were announced as winners of the series, which also meant Jowita won the Glitterball the first time she had a celebrity partner.

References

External links
 

1990 births
English photographers
Nature photographers
Living people
English people of Sudanese descent
Sudanese photographers
Alumni of Bangor University
Alumni of the University of Nottingham
People educated at Wellingborough School
Strictly Come Dancing winners
People from Lochaber